Hostiles is a 2017 American western drama film written and directed by Scott Cooper, based on a story by Donald E. Stewart.  Hostiles stars Christian Bale, Rosamund Pike, Wes Studi, Ben Foster, Stephen Lang, Jesse Plemons, Rory Cochrane, Adam Beach, Q'orianka Kilcher, Jonathan Majors and Timothée Chalamet. It follows a U.S. Army cavalry officer in 1892 who must escort a Cheyenne war chief and his family back to their home in Montana.

The film had its world premiere on September 2, 2017, at the Telluride Film Festival. It had a limited release in the United States by Entertainment Studios beginning December 22, 2017, before going wide on January 26, 2018. It received generally positive reviews from critics, but grossed just $35 million worldwide.

Plot 

In New Mexico in 1892, settler Rosalee Quaid and her family are attacked by a Comanche war group who killed her husband and three children. Rosalee escapes by hiding under a rock outcrop.

At Fort Berringer, soon-to-retire U.S. Army captain Joseph Blocker is ordered by President Harrison to escort the cancer-stricken Cheyenne war chief Yellow Hawk and four members of his family back to their tribal lands in Montana. Blocker initially refuses as he and Yellow Hawk are old enemies, but accepts under the threat of court-martial and loss of his pension. Blocker sets out for Montana accompanied by his old friend first sergeant Thomas Metz, long-time aide corporal Woodson, West Point newcomer lieutenant Kidder, and a young private named Dejardin.

Blocker challenges Yellow Hawk to a knife fight, but he refuses. The group soon comes across the Quaid house and Rosalee's dead husband. Inside the house, they find a traumatized Rosalee and her deceased children. After some convincing, Rosalee agrees to join the company until their next stop-over in Fort Winslow, Colorado. They are soon ambushed by the Comanche who kill Dejardin and seriously injure Woodson before being forced to retreat. After the attack, Yellow Hawk convinces Blocker to unchain him and his family so they can help with future attacks. The following day, three dead Comanches are discovered, and Blocker correctly deduces that Yellow Hawk and his son Black Hawk snuck out of camp and killed them overnight.

At Fort Winslow, the group drops off the wounded Woodson and Blocker arranges for Rosalee to stay with the fort's commander, but she chooses to remain with the group. Blocker is ordered to bring disgraced sergeant Philip Wills to be hanged for murdering a Native family. Two members of the fort, corporal Thomas and sergeant Malloy, join Blocker's company to oversee Wills, who chastises Blocker and the Natives.

Near camp, the chief's daughter Living Woman and Rosalee are abducted and raped by three fur traders. The group hunts down and kills the rapists. Malloy is killed in the fight. The next night, Metz walks into a downpour and begins to express guilt for his past actions against the Natives, leaving Blocker concerned. Meanwhile, Wills feigns illness allowing him to kill Kidder and escape. Metz chases after him against Blocker's orders. The next day, the group finds their bodies with Metz still clutching a gun in his hand following his own apparent suicide. A devastated Blocker is consoled by Rosalee. They travel farther north as Yellow Hawk's condition continues to deteriorate. Blocker makes peace with the chief for the hardships they have inflicted upon one another over the years.

Yellow Hawk dies just as the group arrives at the tribal lands in Montana, where he is buried. As Blocker and others prepare to leave, a white man and his three ranch hands ride up, declare that they own the land, and order Blocker and the rest of the group to leave with the chief's body. Blocker informs them of the president's orders, only to be threatened at gunpoint. Blocker refuses, and a brutal shootout ensues. Black Hawk, Living Woman, Elk Woman and Corporal Thomas are killed and buried next to the chief.

Rosalee decides to take Black Hawk's orphan son, Little Bear, with her to Chicago. At the train station, the pair thank and bid an emotional farewell to Blocker. He hands Little Bear a gift: a book about Julius Caesar. As the train departs, Blocker decides to jump aboard.

Cast 
 Christian Bale as Capt. Joseph J. Blocker, a veteran of the Indian Wars.
 Rosamund Pike as Rosalee Quaid, a widow who joins Blocker's detail after the murder of her family by Comanches.
 Wes Studi as Chief Yellow Hawk, an imprisoned and sickly Cheyenne leader being taken home to die, and the father of Black Hawk and Living Woman.
 Jesse Plemons as Lt. Rudy Kidder, a fresh West Point graduate, part of the detail to escort Yellow Hawk home.
 Adam Beach as Black Hawk, Yellow Hawk's son and Elk Woman's husband.
 Rory Cochrane as 1st Sgt. Thomas Metz, a war-weary veteran who is among Blocker's oldest friends, part of the detail to escort Yellow Hawk Home.
 Peter Mullan as Lt. Col. Ross McCowan, commander of Fort Winslow, Colorado.
 Scott Wilson as Cyrus Lounde, the owner of Yellow Hawk's ancestral land. This marked the final film appearance of Wilson before his death in 2018.
 Paul Anderson as Cpl. Tommy Thomas, a British-born soldier from Fort Winslow escorting Wills to his hanging.
 Timothée Chalamet as Pvt. Philippe Dejardin, the youngest member of the detail to escort Yellow Hawk home.
 Ben Foster as Sgt. Philip Wills, a criminal soldier whom Blocker is charged with escorting to his hanging.
 Jonathan Majors as Cpl. Henry Woodson, a black soldier who served under Blocker for many years, part of the detail to escort Yellow Hawk home.
 John Benjamin Hickey as Cpt. Royce Tolan, a soldier stationed at Fort Berringer alongside Blocker.
 Q'orianka Kilcher as Elk Woman, Black Hawk's wife.
 Tanaya Beatty as Living Woman, Yellow Hawk's daughter.
 Stephen Lang as Col. Abraham Biggs, Blocker's commanding officer
 Bill Camp as Jeremiah Wilks, frontier correspondent for Harper's Weekly.
 Scott Shepherd as Wesley Quaid, Rosalee's slaughtered husband.
 Ryan Bingham as Sgt. Malloy, a soldier from Fort Winslow escorting Wills to his hanging.
 Robyn Malcolm as Minnie McCowan, Col. McCowan's wife.
 Xavier Horsechief as Little Bear, the young son of Black Hawk and Elk Woman.

Production 
The project was announced in February 2016 with Scott Cooper as director and Christian Bale starring. In March, Rosamund Pike was cast, and a production start date of July was announced. In April, Jesse Plemons was cast. Wes Studi and Adam Beach were signed in June. In mid-July, Timothée Chalamet joined the cast.

Filming began late July in Santa Fe, New Mexico. Ben Foster was added to the cast at the beginning of filming. Ryan Bingham, who also stars in the film, wrote and performed "How Shall A Sparrow Fly" for the soundtrack. Max Richter composed the score for the film, which was released by Deutsche Grammophon.

Release
The film had its world premiere at the Telluride Film Festival on September 2, 2017. It was also screened at the Toronto International Film Festival on September 10, 2017. Shortly after, Entertainment Studios acquired U.S. distribution rights to the film. It was released in a limited release in the United States on December 22, 2017, before expanding wide a month later.

Reception

Box office
Hostiles grossed $29.8 million in the United States and Canada, and $5.8 million in other territories, for a worldwide total of $35.5 million.

In the United States and Canada, following several weeks in a limited run where it grossed $1.8 million, Hostiles  had its wide expansion alongside the release of Maze Runner: The Death Cure, and was expected to gross around $10 million from 2,813 theaters over the weekend. It ended up opening to $10.1 million, finishing third behind The Death Cure ($24.2 million) and holdover Jumanji: Welcome to the Jungle ($16.1 million). In its second weekend the film dropped 49.5% to $5.1 million, finishing fifth at the box office.

Critical response
On review aggregator website Rotten Tomatoes, the film holds an approval rating of 71% based on 225 reviews, with a weighted average of 6.8/10. The website's critical consensus reads, "Hostiles benefits from stunning visuals and a solid central performance from Christian Bale, both of which help elevate its uneven story." On Metacritic, the film has a weighted average score of 65 out of 100, based on 41 critics, indicating "generally favorable reviews". Audiences polled by CinemaScore gave the film an average grade of "B" on an A+ to F scale, while PostTrak reported filmgoers gave it an overall 72% positive score.

Following its world premiere at the Telluride Film Festival, Sasha Stone of TheWrap, wrote of the audiences' reaction to the film, saying, "Riveted by the glorious storytelling of Hostiles, a few Telluride audience members burst into spontaneous applause as it built to its conclusion". Todd McCarthy of The Hollywood Reporter wrote praise of the film and of the performance of Christian Bale, concluding that the film is an "estimable piece of work grounded by a fine-grain sensibility and an expertly judged lead performance".

Most of the criticism of the movie was aimed at its writer/director, Scott Cooper. William Bibbiani of IGN said that Cooper wasted the talent of its actors and cinematographer in a "by-the-numbers storyline with a rather obvious message about how it's harder to be despicable to people after you get to know them". He went on to say, "Scott Cooper directs Hostiles with an eye for 'greatness' but the actual material simply isn't deep enough to justify the solemn presentation. It's not entertaining, it's not illuminating, it's not even complicated. It's mostly just a bummer".

The National Congress of American Indians (NCAI) lauded Hostiles for its "authentic representation of Native Peoples" and accurate rendition of Native American languages.

Writing in The Atlantic, David Sims noted the film's "majestic photography", calling it "a handsome-looking western", but faulted the script for "seem[ing] less interested in character development" and was critical of the "harsh and uncompromising" tone of the film, describing its opening scenes as "gory, tough to watch, and short on dialogue, with Cooper intent on showing a world severely lacking in empathy."

Accolades

References

External links 
 
 
 
 

2017 films
2017 drama films
2017 Western (genre) films
2010s American films
2010s English-language films
2010s historical drama films
American historical drama films
American Indian Wars films
American Western (genre) films
Cheyenne-language films
Entertainment Studios films
Films about the United States Army
Films set in 1892
Films set in Colorado
Films set in Montana
Films set in New Mexico
Films shot in New Mexico
Films directed by Scott Cooper
Films scored by Max Richter